Summers County Comprehensive High School is a public high school located in Hinton, West Virginia, United States along the New River in Summers County. It serves 741 students in grades 6-12. SCCHS opened in 1995. The secondary school is the only one in the county. Summers County is located in the southern region of West Virginia. Summers County is known for their Girls' Basketball program and have won 8 Championships with a record Five-time winning streak from 2007-2011. Additionally, they did not lose a game during this same period.

References

External links

Educational institutions established in 1995
Public high schools in West Virginia
Buildings and structures in Summers County, West Virginia
Education in Summers County, West Virginia
1995 establishments in West Virginia